White Coppice is a hamlet near Chorley, Lancashire, England. It was the most populated part of the township of Anglezarke in the 19th century. Close to the settlement in the early 19th century were quarries and small coal mines. The hamlet lies to the north of Anglezarke Reservoir in the Rivington reservoir chain built to provide water for Liverpool in the mid 19th century. To the south west is a hill known as Healey Nab.

White Coppice had a cotton mill at the start of the Industrial Revolution. Its mill lodge provided water for a steam engine, and before that the mill was powered by a waterwheel on the Black Brook. Around 1900 the mill was owned by Alfred Ephraim Eccles, a supporter of the Temperance movement.

Notable residents

 Walter Haworth was born here on 19 March 1883 and won a Nobel Prize in chemistry.
 Sir Henry Tate, 1st Baronet was born on 11 March 1819 in White Coppice. He was an English sugar merchant and philanthropist, noted for establishing the Tate Gallery, London.

Cricket
Cricket is played at a ground in the hamlet. The 1st and 2nd XI cricket teams play in the Moore and Smalley Palace Shield.

The BBC Children's television show Sloggers was filmed at the cricket ground in 1994.

References

External links

White Coppice

Villages in Lancashire
Geography of Chorley
West Pennine Moors